The Delphian League ran for twelve seasons between its formation in 1951 and its merger into the Athenian League in 1963.

1951–52
Six clubs joined from the Spartan League Premier Division:
Aylesbury United
Berkhamsted Town
Brentwood & Warley
Slough Centre
Willesden
Yiewsley

Three clubs joined from the Spartan League Division One:
Bishop's Stortford
Stevenage Town
Wembley

Three clubs joined from the London League Premier Division:
Cheshunt
Rainham Town
Woodford Town

Two clubs joined from the Metropolitan League:
Dagenham
Leatherhead

1952–53
Two new clubs joined the league for the 1952–53 season:
Hemel Hempstead (from the Spartan League)
Hornchurch & Upminster (from the Spartan League)

1953–54

1954–55
One new club joined the league for the 1954–55 season:
Tuffnell Park Edmonton (from the Spartan League)

1955–56
One new club joined the league for the 1955–56 season:
Ware (from the Spartan League)

1956–57
One new club joined the league for the 1956–57 season:
Letchworth Town (from the Spartan League)

1957–58
Two new clubs joined the league for the 1957–58 season:
Aveley (from the London League)
Wokingham Town (from the Metropolitan League)

1958–59
One new club joined the league for the 1958–59 season:
Harrow Town (from the Spartan League)

1959–60
One new club joined the league for the 1959–60 season:
Hertford Town (from the Spartan League)

1960–61
Two new clubs joined the league for the 1960–61 season:
Histon (from the Spartan League)
Windsor & Eton (from the Metropolitan League)

1961–62
One new club joined the league for the 1961–62 season:
Harlow Town (from the London League)

1962–63
Two new clubs joined the league for the 1962–63 season:
Tilbury (from the London League)
Wingate (from the London League)
Due to the severe weather during the winter, the league was abandoned, with clubs having played between 11 and 18 matches. The league was split into East and West sections, with the clubs playing each other once. The two winners of the sections played a two-leg play-off for the championship.

East Division

West Division

Play-off

References